Kalma Chowk may refer to:

 Kalma Chowk, a square, road intersection in Lahore, Pakistan
 Kalma Chowk Flyover, a road flyover, overpass in Lahore, Pakistan